The Hagström Viking was the first semi-acoustic guitar manufactured by Hagström. It was originally launched in 1965 and was built until it was discontinued in 1979 a few years before Hagström closed down their manufacturing in Sweden. The Viking is currently being reproduced by the Hagström brand.

1965 to 1979
The Hagström Viking was the first semi-acoustic guitar built by the Hagström company. It was launched in 1965 alongside Hagström's new 12-string guitar and two bass guitars. Two years later there was a twelve-string model launched simple called the Viking 12 and the Viking II Deluxe which featured gold plated machine heads and adjustable bridges. In 1967 Hagström player Frank Zappa's "Nifty, Tough & Bitchen" advertising agency was hired to promote the Hagström brand in the USA. This resulted in three print ads: "Nifty", "Long and Slippery", and "Folk Rock is a Drag", and a radio spot: "Long and Slippery". 

In 1968 Hagström got much publicity when Elvis Presley played a Hagström Viking at the Elvis Presley Comeback Television Special for N.B.C. in the USA. Al Casey played a Viking II in the orchestra and was asked by producer Bones Howe if Elvis could borrow the guitar for the appearance. According to Elvis's drummer Hal Blaine it was considered a lucky charm by Elvis. To take advantage of this Hagström used pictures of Elvis with the Viking in ads until Elvis's manager advised them not to.

In 1972 the Viking I N replaced the original Viking; it was slightly reworked with two humbuckers replacing the original single-coil pickups and a new headstock called the ducks foot which previously had been used on the Hagström Swede. At the end of 1975 Schaller machine-heads replaced the older Van Ghent. From 1977 to 1978 all guitars featured Schaller machine-head with special butterfly design from Jimmy D´Aquisto. In 1979 the Viking was discontinued and four years later the Hagström plant in Sweden finally closed its doors.

I can tell you that Elvis loved that guitar, he felt that it was a lucky charm for his comeback.
- Hal Blaine

2004 to present
As of 2004 the Hagström brand has been resurrected and is currently marketing models based on the popular Swedish designs including the Viking. The new lineup is being produced in a dedicated plant in China, and includes four Viking models: the Viking, the Viking DeLuxe, the Super Viking and the Viking IIP. The Viking and Viking DeLuxe are fairly similar while the Viking IIP has several differences to allow a lower price.

In 2008 Dweezil Zappa joins up with Hagström to recreate the ads and to recreate some of his father's music in the "Zappa plays Zappa" tour.

The Viking feels amazing, and it has a great natural sustain. It has an awesome vintage tone right out of the case, So then I can use my outboard gear to sculpt the sound as necessary.
- Dweezil Zappa

Notable users

Elvis Presley - 68 Comeback Special
Frank Zappa - The Mothers of Invention
Dweezil Zappa - Zappa plays Zappa
Pat Smear - Nirvana, Foo Fighters and the Germs
Uno Svenningsson - (Swedish singer/songwriter)
Johan Persson - Hovet
 Tim Armstrong - Rancid (band)
 Ginger Wildheart - The Wildhearts, Hey! Hello!, solo, and various side-projects
Al Muir - Trunkshot

External links
Official site
Albin Hagström website
Hagstrom Viking Video

References
UK Hagström site
Vintage Viking specs

Semi-acoustic guitars